Mart de Kruif MSM is a three-star general in the Royal Netherlands Army and served as its executive commander.

Biography

Mart De Kruif received his military education at the Royal Military Academy in Breda. Later he was also educated at the Führungsakademie der Bundeswehr and the U.S. Army War College. He held several positions within the Netherlands Army before he became commander of the 43 Gemechaniseerde Brigade in Havelte in 2007.

On 1 November 2008 he was promoted to Major General. On the same day he took over the Regional Command South (RC-S) of the International Security Assistance Force (ISAF) in Afghanistan from Canadian Major General Marc Lessard. Under his command the size of RC-S doubled to 40.000 troops. He held this command until 1 November 2009, when he was succeeded by British Major General Nick Carter.

From May 2010 till October 2011 he served as the Deputy Commander of the Royal Netherlands Army. Promoted to Lieutenant General on 17 October 2011, de Kruif assumed the post of Commander of the Royal Netherlands Army on 25 October. He retired on 24 March 2016.

References

1958 births
Living people
Commanders of the Royal Netherlands Army
Royal Netherlands Army generals
Royal Netherlands Army officers
Dutch military personnel of the War in Afghanistan (2001–2021)
People from Apeldoorn
Knights Commander of the Order of Merit of the Federal Republic of Germany
Commanders of the Order of Orange-Nassau
United States Army War College alumni
Graduates of the Koninklijke Militaire Academie